Khánh Hải may refer to several places in Vietnam:

 , a township and capital of Ninh Hải District
 Khánh Hải, Cà Mau, a rural commune of Trần Văn Thời District
 , a rural commune of Yên Khánh District